Etiocholanolone glucuronide (ETIO-G) is an endogenous, naturally occurring metabolite of testosterone. It is formed in the liver from etiocholanolone by UDP-glucuronyltransferases. ETIO-G has much higher water solubility than etiocholanolone and is eventually excreted in the urine via the kidneys. Along with androsterone glucuronide, it is one of the major inactive metabolites of testosterone.

See also
 3α,5β-Androstanediol
 5β-Dihydrotestosterone
 Androstanediol glucuronide

References

External links
 Metabocard for Etiocholanolone Glucuronide (HMDB04484) - Human Metabolome Database

Etiocholanes
Glucuronide esters
Human metabolites
Steroid esters